David Raphael ben Abraham Polido was a Jewish satirist. He wrote Zikhron Purim, a parody on the piyyutim for Purim, followed by a testament of Haman, a poem full of coarse jokes, but a good imitation of the Sephardic piyyutim (Livorno, 1703). 

His name, and the fact that his work was printed in Livorno, suggest that he was an Italian; but Somerhausen reads  ('Polonya' or 'Polnia') instead of Polido, whereas Steinschneider interprets it as 'Fulda.'

Notes

References
 

Year of death unknown
Year of birth unknown
Hebrew-language poets
Satirists
17th-century poets
18th-century poets
17th-century Jews
18th-century Jews